Poshteh Jazayeri (also Romanized as Poshteh Jazāyerī) is a village in Koregah-e Gharbi Rural District, in the Central District of Khorramabad County, Lorestan Province, Iran. At the 2006 census, its population was 490, in 101 families.

References 

Towns and villages in Khorramabad County